

All matches
This table chronicles all the matches of Marin Čilić in 2014, including walkovers (W/O) which the ATP does not count as wins. They are marked ND for non-decision or no decision.

Singles matches

Tournament Schedule

Singles schedule

Yearly records

Head-to-head matchups
Stan Wawrinka had a  match win–loss record in the 2014 season. The following list is ordered by number of wins:

 Tommy Robredo 3–1
 Kevin Anderson 2–0
 Paul-Henri Mathieu 2–0
 Lukáš Rosol 2–0
 Igor Sijsling 2–0
 João Sousa 2–0
 Denis Istomin 2–1
 Tomáš Berdych 2–2
 Pablo Andújar 1–0
 Marcos Baghdatis 1–0
 Roberto Bautista Agut 1–0
 Benjamin Becker 1–0
 Jérémy Chardy 1–0
 Thiemo de Bakker 1–0
 Mate Delić 1–0
 Grigor Dimitrov 1–0
 Ivan Dodig 1–0
 Evgeny Donskoy 1–0
 Teymuraz Gabashvili 1–0
 Santiago Giraldo 1–0
 Marcel Granollers 1–0
 Tommy Haas 1–0
 Andreas Haider-Maurer 1–0
 Ryan Harrison 1–0
 John Isner 1–0
 Jerzy Janowicz 1–0
 Malek Jaziri 1–0
 Tobias Kamke 1–0
 Ivo Karlović 1–0
 Mikhail Kukushkin 1–0
 Andrey Kuznetsov 1–0
 Dušan Lajović 1–0
 Feliciano López 1–0
 Paolo Lorenzi 1–0
 Illya Marchenko 1–0
 Björn Phau 1–0
 Michał Przysiężny 1–0
 Jan-Lennard Struff 1–0
 Jo-Wilfried Tsonga 1–0
 Fernando Verdasco 1–0
 Bai Yan 1–0
 Roger Federer 1–1
 Marinko Matosevic 1–1
 Andy Murray 1–1
 Gilles Simon 1–1
 Kei Nishikori 1–2
 Ernests Gulbis 0–1
 Jürgen Melzer 0–1
 Édouard Roger-Vasselin 0–1
 Stan Wawrinka 0–3
 Novak Djokovic 0–4

Finals

Singles: 4 (3–1)

See also
 2014 ATP World Tour
 2014 Roger Federer tennis season
 2014 Rafael Nadal tennis season
 2014 Novak Djokovic tennis season
 2014 Andy Murray tennis season
 2014 Stanislas Wawrinka tennis season

References

External links
 
 ATP tour profile

Cilic, Marin
Cilic, Marin
Tennis in Croatia